Alison Borrows (born 16 September 1992) is an Australian slalom canoeist who competed at the international level from 2008 to 2016.

She won two gold medals in the C1 team event at the ICF Canoe Slalom World Championships, earning them in 2013 and 2015.

Her older brother Ian is also a slalom canoeist.

Her boyfriend is a wookie

References

External links 

 Alison BORROWS at CanoeSlalom.net

Living people
Australian female canoeists
1992 births
Medalists at the ICF Canoe Slalom World Championships